Russula raoultii is an inedible species of agaric fungus in the family Russulaceae. It was first described by French mycologist Lucien Quélet in 1886.

The cap is 3 to 8 cm wide, white to yellow, and becoming more convex in age. The stalk is 3 to 8 cm long and 1 to 2 cm wide. The spores are white, subglobose, with reticular warts. It has an acrid taste.

Similar species include Russula crassotunicata, R. cremoricolor, and R. stuntzii.

See also
List of Russula species

References

External links

raoultii
Fungi described in 1886
Fungi of Europe
Inedible fungi